Silberhornstraße is an U-Bahn station in Munich on the U2 and U7. It is located in upper Giesing.

References

Munich U-Bahn stations
Railway stations in Germany opened in 1980
1980 establishments in West Germany